Under the Couch (UTC) is a currently displaced live music venue, recording studio, and lounge formerly located in the Student Center at the Georgia Institute of Technology, in Atlanta, Georgia.  Under the Couch is run by the Musician's Network (MN), a Tier II Georgia Tech student organization. Musician's Network meetings are held at 7pm every Monday night during regular school semesters in Under the Couch and are open to all Georgia Tech students and alumni.

History
Under the Couch, originally established by the Georgia Tech Musician's Network in 1995, was previously located underneath the Couch Band Building on West Campus. In the fall of 2010, UTC moved to a new location on the second floor of the student center, replacing the Music Listening Room and continuing the daytime use of the room for similar activities. However, with the demolition of the original Wenn Student Center in the fall of 2020, Under the Couch is currently displaced, and current plans for the student center renovation do not allocate any space for the venue.  GT student Charlie McCann came up with the name Under the Couch while brainstorming a long list of possible names for the venue.  Charlie was the roommate and bandmate of UTC founder Randy McDow.

Bands that have played at Under the Couch

This is a list of some of the more famous bands that have played at Under the Couch.

 Weezer
 Taking Back Sunday
 Jimmy Eat World
 Dashboard Confessional
 Cartel
 Mastodon
 The Dillinger Escape Plan
 Underoath
 Norma Jean
 New Found Glory
 Titus Andronicus
 Converge
 Bomb the Music Industry!
 Hot Water Music
 Lightning Bolt
 Poison the Well
 The World Is a Beautiful Place & I Am No Longer Afraid to Die
 The Ataris
 Tigers Jaw
 Teenage Bottlerocket
 Twin Shadow
 Group X
 The World/Inferno Friendship Society
 Circle Takes the Square
 Laura Stevenson
 The Protomen
 Koo Koo Kanga Roo
 Paul Baribeau
 Dads
 Kishi Bashi

Musician's Network
The Musician's Network was established in the 1980s by Georgia Tech students in order to
 unite musicians on campus,
 provide and promote opportunities for members to play in the local area,
 and to provide equipment and facilities to facilitate and advance the musical creations of the members

Current Use
Under the Couch provides a variety services for the Georgia Tech and Atlanta community. UTC provides Georgia Tech students with practice and storage space, a lounge space during daytime operation, as well as a venue space for GT student organizations. For both Georgia Tech students and the general public, UTC facilitates live shows, open mic nights, and a 16-track studio recording facility.

References

External links 
 
Booking for Local or Touring Bands
Old UTC website (2002-2007)

Georgia Tech